Ján Horecký (born 23 June 1968 in Trenčín) is a Slovak teacher and education manager, who has served as the Minister of Education, Science, Research and Sport of Slovakia in the government of Eduard Heger since 4 October 2020.

Teaching career 
In 1991 Horecký graduated in teaching of Mathematics and Geography at the  Comenius University. Between 1991–1997 he worked as a teacher at the Ján Papánek High School in Bratislava. Between 1997–2003 he worked as a teacher at the Gymnasium Jur Hronec. Until 1999 he also headed the school's Foundation. Between 2004–2008 he taught at the United School at Tilgnerova 14 in Bratislava.  In 2008 he became the Principal of the Catholic St. Francis United School, a position he held until 2020. Between 2011–2019 Horecký  served as the chairman of the Union of Catholic Schools in Slovakia. In 2022, he became the Director of  Felix, a network of private schools.

Political career 
In 2006–2010 and again between from 2014, he served as a councilor of the Karlova Ves borough of Bratislava. In 2022 the position of Minister of Education became vacant after the Freedom and Solidarity party left the government and its ministers reigned. Horecký came recommended to the PM Eduard Heger by the influential Conservative MP Richard Vašečka. Horecký's conservative values made him acceptable also to the Speaker of the Parliament Boris Kollár who insisted the post is filled by a "conservative-leaning expert".

On 4 October 2022, the President of the Slovak Republic, Zuzana Čaputová, appointed J. Horecký as the Minister of Education, Science, Research and Sport of the Slovak Republic on the proposal of the Prime Minister of the Slovak Republic, Eduard Heger. She stated that the Minister meets the requirements of the Tricoalition for a conservative-oriented expert, but reminded him that by appointing him, he ceases to be the manager of a single network of schools with a clear-cut world-view.

References 

Education ministers of Slovakia
People from Trenčín
Living people
1968 births
Comenius University alumni